Swimmer is a 2012 Scottish short film directed by Lynne Ramsay. The film won Best Short Film at the 66th British Academy Film Awards.

Cast

Tom Litten as The Swimmer.

Production

The film was one of 4 unique co-commissions in partnership between BBC Films, Film4 and the London Organising Committee of the Olympic and Paralympic Games to celebrate the 2012 Summer Olympics.

Reception

Director Lynne Ramsay was nominated for Best Short at the British Independent Film Awards (BIFA). Ramsay went on to receive a BAFTA Award for Best Short Film at the 66th British Academy Film Awards in 2013 for Swimmer.

References

External links

2012 drama films
2012 films
BAFTA winners (films)
Films directed by Lynne Ramsay
2012 short films
British drama short films
2012 Cultural Olympiad
2010s British films